Romanovka is a rural locality (a selo) in Chuvalkipovsky Selsoviet, Chishminsky District, Bashkortostan, Russia. The population was 8 as of 2010. There is 1 street.

Geography 
Romanovka is located 42 km south of Chishmy (the district's administrative centre) by road. Chuvalkipovo is the nearest rural locality.

References 

Rural localities in Chishminsky District